Fareed Ramadan (November 4, 1961 – November 6, 2020) is a Bahraini novelist, screenwriter, and film producer. He is often considered one of the most prominent Gulf novelists and worked to deconstruct the discourse of racism through his work on cultural identities in Bahrain, to the point that some critics called him a "novelist of identities." Among his most prominent works are the novel The English Ocean and the screenplay of the film The Sleeping Tree.

Born on Muharraq Island, Ramadan published his first collection of stories in 1984, entitled البياض ("White"). He worked part-time from the time he was very young at the local newspapers, Al-Adwaa and Al Ayam. Later, he became the culture editor at other papers, Al-Watan and Al-Waqt, as well as the magazine, Hana Bahrain. He has written many screenplays for radio and television, and has also written commercials and documentaries. He has written both feature and short film scripts for many directors in Bahrain, the United Arab Emirates, Iraq, and Palestine. Ramadan and Bahraini director Mohammed Rashed Bu Ali founded their own studio, Nuran Pictures. His first novel, غيمة لباب البحرين ("A Cloud for Bab Al Bahrain"), was published in 1994 by Kalimat Books, owned by the Bahrain Writers’ Association. His 2007 novel, السوافح؛ ماء النعيم ("Clematis: Water of Bliss"), won first prize in a national fiction award from the Ministry of Information. His work is marked by an interest in the issue of identity, particularly in light of the massive immigration to the Gulf in recent years and its accompanying socioeconomic changes.

Biography
Ramadan was born the fifth of seven siblings to the second wife of a pearl diver father. After the discovery of oil in Bahrain in 1932, his father joined a rush of former divers to work for Bahrain Petroleum Company. Farid and his eldest sibling suffered congenital sickle cell-beta thalassemia, but he was able to complete his secondary school studies in literature at Al-Hidaya Al-Khalifia Boys’ School in 1980. Afterward, he studied air traffic control at the Qatar Aeronautical College and then studied Business Administration at the Gulf College of Technology. Finally, he obtained a diploma in Computer Science and Business Administration from the Bournemouth Center for Computers and Technology in the United Kingdom and the Awal Institute in Bahrain.

In addition to working at the Ministry of Finance & National Economy, he worked part-time in the local press until 2003, when he devoted himself full-time to the journalism, literature, radio, television, and cinema. He participated in many forums and conferences, including one on "Photos from the Middle East" in Denmark in the wake of the Jyllands-Posten Muhammad cartoons controversy in 2005, and the PEN International Congress in Senegal in 2007. He attended the Cairo International Forum for Arab Fiction Creativity in 2005 and 2015, and participated in many Arab and international film festivals, sometimes as a judge.

Works

Literature
 البياض ("White"), short stories, Bahrain, 1984
 تلك الصغيرة التي تشبهك – نص ("The Little One That Looks Like You"), essays, Bahrain: Bahrain Writers’ Association, 1991 
 التنور...غيمة لباب البحرين (“Tannour: A Cloud for Bab Al Bahrain”), novel, Bahrain: Bahrain Writers’ Association (1st ed.)/Manama: Masaa Publishing-Republished in Canada (2nd ed.), 1994 (1st ed.), 2014 (2nd ed.)
 نوران (“Nuran”), collaboration with plastic artist Jamal Abdul Rahim who signed 50 copies, Bahrain (1st ed.)/Cairo: Dar Sharqiyat (2nd ed.), 1995 (1st ed.), 1997 (2nd ed.)
 البرزخ...نجمة في سفر (“The Isthmus: A Wandering Star”), novel, Beirut:Arab Foundation for Research and Publishing (1st ed.)/Manama-Canada: Masaa (2nd ed.), 2000 (1st ed.), 2018 (2nd ed.)
 السوافح...ماء النعيم (“Clematis: Water of Bliss”), novel, Beirut:Arab Foundation for Research and Publishing (1st ed.)/Manama-Canada: Masaa (2nd ed.),, 2006 (1st ed.), 2018 (2nd ed.)
 عطر أخير للعائلة ("The Last Fragrance for the Family"), incomplete memoir, Manama: Ministry of Information (1st ed.)/Manama: Dar Al Farasha (2nd ed.), 2008 (1st ed.), 2021 (2nd ed.)
 مسرحيات عربية ("Arabic Plays"), play collection written with leading Bahraini playwrights, Sharjah: Department of Culture, 2010
 رنين الموج ("The Ringing Waves"), collaboration with plastic artist Omar Al Rashid, Bahrain, 2012
 المحيط الإنجليزي ("The English Ocean"), novel, Beirut: Dar Soual, 2018

Television documentaries
 تاريخ الخيول العربية في البحرين ("History of Arabian horses in Bahrain")
 البحرين.. زهرة الخليج ("Bahrain: The Flower of the Gulf”)
 صناعة السفن في البحرين (“Shipbuilding Industry in Bahrain”)
 صناعة النسيج والفخار (“Textile and Pottery Industry”)
 تاريخ القلاع في البحرين (“History of Castles in Bahrain”)
 متحف البحرين (“Bahrain Museum”)

Radio
 الغلام القتيل؛ طرفة بن العبد (“The Slain Boy Tarafa ibn al-'Abd"), dramatic radio series directed by Nabil al-Alawim, Bahrain Radio, 2004
 أعلام من الخليج العربي ("Luminaries of the Gulf"), joint Gulf Cooperation Council program containing profiles of famed individuals in Gulf media, 2006

Film

Feature films
 Za’er, screenplay, directed by Bassam Al-Thawadi, 2004, Dunia Productions
 A Bahraini Tale, screenplay, directed by Bassam Al-Thawadi, 2006, Bahrain Film Production Company
 The Sleeping Tree, story, directed by Mohammed Rashed Bu Ali, 2014, Nuran Pictures

Short films
 المسافات الدائرية ("Circular Distances"), directed by Yousef Malallah, 1986
 موت شاعر: تحية لخليل حاوي ("Death of a Poet: A Tribute to Khalil Hawi"), directed by Khaled Janahi, 1998
 الراية ("Ar-Rawa"), directed by Nizar Jawad, 2005
 البشارة ("Al-Bashara"), directed by Mohammed Rashed Bu Ali, 2009
 بالأمس ("Yesterday"), co-written with Hossam Tawfik and directed by Ammar al-Kooheji, 2009
 صولو ("Solo"), directed by Ali Al Jabri (Emirates), 2010
 سكون ("Sleep"), directed by Ammar al-Kooheji, 2012
 صبر الملح ("Patience of Salt"), directed by Mohamed Ibrahim, 2012
 شكوى ("Complaint"), directed by Imad Ali (Iraq), 2013
 زينب ("Zainab"), directed by Mohamed Ibrahim, 2014
 قوس قزح ("Rainbow"), directed by Mahmoud El Sheikh, 2014
 مكان خاص جدا ("A Very Special Place"), directed by Jamal al-Ghailan, 2014
 ترويدة ("Troy"), directed by Muhammad Ateeq, 2014

Awards
 First Prize in Short Story Competition for الخسوف ("Eclipse"), Bahrain Supreme Council for Youth and Sports, 1983
 First Prize in Playwriting Competition for درب المصل ("Path of Serum"), Bahrain Ministry of Information, 2005
 First Prize in Novel Competition for السوافح...ماء النعيم, Bahrain Ministry of Information, 2007
 Second Prize in Playwriting Competition for الرهمة.. طق يا مطر طق ("Al-Rahmah…Knock, O Rain, Knock"), Bahrain Ministry of Information, 2007
 Short Film Production Grant for شكوى, Injaz Dubai, 2012
 Short Film Production Grant for زينب and مكان خاص جدا, Bahrain Film Production Company, 2012
 "Best Screenplay" Award for سكون, GCC Film Festival (Kuwait), 2013
 Short-List Nomination for IWC Filmmaker Award for الشجرة النائمة, Dubai International Film Festival, 2013
 Second Prize in Arab Cinema Horizons for الشجرة النائمة, Cairo International Film Festival, 2015
 "Best Screenplay" Award for قوس قزح, Wasit International Short Film Festival (Iraq), 2016
 Second Prize for الشجرة النائمة, GCC Film Festival (Abu Dhabi), 2016
 UAE Interior Ministry Award for "Best Social-Interest Screenplay" for خط تماس, at the 14th Dubai International Film Festival, 2017

Death
In late 2020, his health began to worsen as sickle cell anemia complications led to lung failure that hospitalized him several times. A day after the last of them, on November 6, 2020, he died due to steep oxygen and blood pressure loss and the consequent heart attack.

Legacy
 Farid Ramadan Award for "Best Screenplay of a Gulf Feature Film": A new award introduced at the Al Ain International Film Festival's third edition on January 23, 2021, where he was featured in the "In Memoriam" segment
 Farid Ramadan Scholarship: To be introduced for $1,000 with an endowment from Nuran Pictures at the first annual Bahrain Film Festival in April 2021

References

Bahraini writers
2020 deaths
People from Muharraq
1961 births